Armando Jesús Baez Pinal (born 30 September 1961) is a Mexican politician from the Institutional Revolutionary Party. From 2009 to 2012 he served as Deputy of the LXI Legislature of the Mexican Congress representing the Federal District.

He is one of the 100 Constitutional Deputies that are writing the Constitution of Mexico City. And member of CTM as Secretary of Culture.

References

1961 births
Living people
Politicians from Mexico City
Institutional Revolutionary Party politicians
21st-century Mexican politicians
Deputies of the LXI Legislature of Mexico
Members of the Chamber of Deputies (Mexico) for Mexico City